= Great Korea =

Great Korea (Korean: 대한; Hanja: 大韓; RR: Daehan; MR: Taehan) may refer to:

- Korean Empire (Korean: 대한제국; Hanja: 大韓帝國; RR: Daehan Jeguk; MR: Taehan Cheguk; lit. Empire of Great Korea)
- South Korea (Korean: 대한민국; Hanja: 大韓民國; RR: Daehan Minguk; MR: Taehan Minguk; lit. Republic of Great Korea)
